Cindy Burger and Arantxa Rus were the defending champions, but both players chose not to participate.

Mariana Duque and María Irigoyen won the title, defeating Aleksandra Krunić and Nina Stojanović in the final, 7–6(7–3), 7–5.

Seeds

Draw

References
Main Draw

Sport11 Ladies Open - Doubles